Karuppur is a village in the Pattukottai Talk, pincode:614903 of Thanjavur district, Tamil Nadu, India.

Demographics 
As per the 2001 census, Karuppur had a total population of 1454 with 727 males and 727 females. The sex ratio was 1000. The literacy rate was 75.93

References 
 

Villages in Thanjavur district